The Pegasus School is a co-ed, non-profit, non-sectarian, private day school on a  campus in Huntington Beach, California.

History
In 1984, Laura Hathaway founded The Pegasus School.

The school purchased its current facility in 1995 and then began work to refurbish classrooms and expand buildings. The Palley Complex which serves fourth and fifth graders was added in 1997 and the Hathaway Activities Center was built in 2000 to provide a home for performance, art, and student athletics.

Laura Hathaway was the first head of school.  John Zurn was appointed the second head of The Pegasus School in February 2010. Jason Lopez joined the Pegasus community in July 2014 as the third head of school and still is currently.

Average class size
Pre-Kindergarten:16 students in a classroom with two teachers

Kindergarten: 18 students in a classroom with a teacher and associate teacher

First through Fifth grades: 20 students per classroom with a teacher and teaching assistant

Sixth through Eighth Grades: 16-18 students in a classroom with a teacher and teaching assistant.

Recognitions
The Pegasus School is a nationally recognized blue ribbon school

Environmental aspects
The school is an energy star pledge participant.

References

External links
 

Private elementary schools in California
Private middle schools in California
Educational institutions established in 1984
1984 establishments in California
Huntington Beach, California